Famous Brands Limited is a public company listed on the Johannesburg Stock Exchange (JSE) in South Africa. The head offices situated in Midrand, Johannesburg. The company is Africa's leading quick-service and casual dining restaurant franchisor. The company's global footprint of franchised stores totals 2,824 stores (2022). Besides it's core business activities of quick service and casual dining, the company is also involved in food and beverage manufacturing and logistics with a focus on owning and managing the back-end supply chain of its restaurants.

History 
George “Senior” Halamandres was born in Lemnos, Greece and as an adult lived in the United States for a time in the early 1950’s. While living there he discovered new concepts in the food industry and took notice. One of them being the concept of “franchising” which he successfully introduced to South Africa. He opened the first Milky Lane in 1959 and first Golden Spur in 1961 and through the following years built an impressive number of stores, ranging from steak houses and take-away stores.

George “Senior” Halamandres, who was also known as “Uncle George”, was in fact a “Halamandaris”, the different surname was due to a spelling error that was made at the Home Affairs department when his family emigrated to South Africa.

George “Senior” Halamandres (or Halamandaris) had 2 sons: George “Junior” and Johnny, and a brother Nikolas Halamandaris. Nikolas had 4 sons: Panayiotis, Theofanis, Periklis and Babis.

1971: Uncle George brings his nephew Panayiotis (the oldest Halamandaris brother) from Greece to South Africa. 
1972: Panayiotis buys the Steers Fast Food store in Bellevue from Uncle George and operates the store independently under his control - marking the start of the Famous Brands story.
1974: Theofanis (the second oldest Halamandaris brother) emigrates from Greece to South Africa and works at local supermarkets for a short while before buying the Bellevue store from his brother Panayiotis, as Panayiotis returns to Greece.
1976: George “Junior” Halamandres (Uncle George’s oldest son) passes away which causes severe emotional trauma to Uncle George and he starts to loose interest in the food industry.
1976-1980: Theofanis continues to innovate and develop his store, improving every aspect of the operation. It was during this period where the foundation of the brand was engineered and the blueprint developed upon which future stores were built.
1980: Panayiotis from Greece and Periklis from Australia (the third oldest Halamandaris brother) arrive in South Africa for Theofanis’ wedding. They decide that Panayiotis and Periklis are to return to South Africa in the near future to expand the business.
1981: Periklis emigrates to South Africa and the two brothers open the second store in Yeoville.
1982: Panayiotis returns to South Africa and joins Theofanis and Periklis in operating and managing the stores.
1983: The three brothers open the third store in the Sandton City shopping mall in Johannesburg. Unknown at the time, a store that would change everything and put the brand on the map. The store booms within months and the business leaps to new heights.
1984: Uncle George sees the success of the three brothers and proposes for his son and the three brothers to join forces, which proved to be a long standing and powerful unit of men. Each member takes on their responsibilities, Panayiotis finances, Theofanis operations, Periklis franchising and Johnny marketing. The unit agrees on core principles from the start: ethical business conduct, hard work and trust between themselves.
1984: Babis (the youngest Halamandaris brother) emigrates to South Africa to join and help in expanding the business.
1984-1994: The now five-man unit focuses on the expansion and success of the business, no diversions and business only.
1994: The management team take the company public on the Johannesburg Stock Exchange on 9 November 1994 at the IPO price of R1 under the company name Steers Holdings Limited, which was later renamed Famous Brands Limited.
1997: Periklis and Babis relocate to Greece to further expand the Steers brand into the country, which unfortunately comes to an end in 1999.
1999: Periklis and Babis become non-executive directors and decide to pursue their private careers.
2000: Johnny becomes a non-executive director.
2007: Panayiotis becomes the non-executive Chairman.
2010: Theofanis becomes the Deputy Chairman in order to transition his CEO position to new leadership.
2012-2014: Panayiotis relinquishes his position as Chairman and Theofanis his position as the Deputy Chairman and both men become non-executive directors. At this time, the company is handed to the next generation and the company portfolio is powerful, comprising the major brands Steers, Wimpy, Debonairs Pizza, FishAways, House of Coffees, tashas and Mugg & Bean amongst others, holding over 2,100 stores locally and internationally, employing over 3,000 people directly and over 65,000 indirectly through the franchise network. Every brand held by the company is the leader in it’s category and the company is awarded the “First and Overall Winner” in the Financial Mail’s “Top Company” Awards, essentially awarding the company the top spot for of all companies listed on the Johannesburg Stock Exchange.
2017: The family unit fully retire from the company and allowing the next generation to take over. All men continue to hold their personal shareholding in the company for the foreseeable future.

Brands
The Brands portfolio consists of 17 restaurant brands, represented by a network of 2,824 restaurants across (2022):
1. South Africa (SA): 2,470 restaurants
2. The rest of Africa and the Middle East (AME): 287 restaurants in 16 countries
3. The United Kingdom (UK): 67 restaurants

The portfolio is segmented into Leading (mainstream) Brands and Signature (niche) Brands. Leading Brands are further categorised as Quick Service and Casual Dining (2022):

LEADING BRANDS (2022): Steers, Debonairs Pizza, FishAways, Milky Lane, Mugg & Bean, Wimpy
SIGNATURE BRANDS (2022): Mythos, Lupa, Turn 'n Tender Steakhouse, Salsa Mexican Grill, Paul (licensed by Paul International), Vovotelo, Fego Cafe, House of Coffees, Coffee Couture
OTHER (2022): Aqua Monte, Baltimore, TruFruit, Gold Seal

References

External links
 Official website

Companies based in Johannesburg
Companies listed on the Johannesburg Stock Exchange
Food and drink companies of South Africa